The City of Wellington by-election 1858 was a by-election held in the multi-member  electorate during the 2nd New Zealand Parliament, on 27 July 1858.

The by-election was caused by the resignation of two of the three incumbent MPs Isaac Featherston and William Fitzherbert, and was won by Featherston and William Rhodes. On nomination day (26 July) Featherston, Rhodes, Jerningham Wakefield and William Bowler were nominated, and after a show of hands in favour of  Rhodes and Featherston a poll was demanded by Wakefield and Bowler. Featherston and Rhodes were subsequently elected the following day.

Results

References

Wellington 1858
1858 elections in New Zealand
1850s in Wellington
July 1858 events
Politics of the Wellington Region